Lachezar Kovachev (Bulgarian: Лъчезар Ковачев; born 24 March 1999) is a Bulgarian footballer who plays as a defender for Spartak Pleven.

Kovachev's older brother Svetoslav is playing for Ludogorets.

Career

Ludogorets Razgrad
Kovachev made his debut for Ludogorets Razgrad II on 16 September 2017 in a league match against Tsarsko Selo Sofia. He completed his professional debut on 20 May 2018, in the last league match for the season for Ludogorets against Botev Plovdiv, as a started together with his brother, but was substituted by another debutant Dimitar Iliev at the 64th minute after a light injury.

Lokomotiv Gorna Oryahovitsa
On 8 January 2019 Kovachev was set to join the Third League team Spartak Pleven, but just two days later the manager of the Second League team Lokomotiv Gorna Oryahovitsa announced that Kovachev will join his team instead.

Career statistics

Club

References

External links
 

1999 births
Living people
Bulgarian footballers
Bulgaria youth international footballers
PFC Ludogorets Razgrad II players
PFC Ludogorets Razgrad players
PFC Spartak Pleven players
First Professional Football League (Bulgaria) players
Second Professional Football League (Bulgaria) players
Association football defenders
Sportspeople from Pleven